"French Kiss" is a song by American DJ and record producer Lil Louis that became a European and American hit in 1989, despite being banned by the BBC. The song also was a hit in clubs around the world and it spent two weeks at number one on the US Billboard Dance Club Songs chart in October 1989. It became a crossover pop hit, peaking at number 50 on the Billboard Hot 100. It was also a mainstream pop hit in the United Kingdom, where it peaked at number two in August 1989.

Originally an instrumental song (apart from wordless moans), vocals were recorded after the song was picked up for distribution by major labels. In the United States, the lead vocals on the track were performed by American singer Shawn Christopher and in Europe vocal duties were performed by a woman known only as "Pasquale".

Structure and usage
Distinctions of this song are that it is based on a single note (F-natural) and that it gradually slows down to a complete stop, marked by the sound of female moans, and then gradually speeding up. This was an innovative feature for any dance track at that time. The song includes a more erotic vocal performance than the title implies.

The American 12-inch single was never released commercially on compact disc. It was sampled heavily on Josh Wink's single "How's Your Evening So Far?"—credited to Wink vs. Lil Louis. It was also sampled on the Wiseguys' 1998 song "Au-Pair Girls". In 1990, French TV presenter Lagaf' used a sample of the song in a parodic version under the name Bo le lavabo (WC Kiss).

The song was also sampled on a remix of "The Loco-Motion" for Kylie Minogue's 1990 Enjoy Yourself Tour titled "The Oz Tour Mix", which remained unreleased in studio form for many years until it was finally released on the bonus disc of remixes of the 2002 compilation Greatest Hits '87–'92.

The track was featured on the 1999 Carl Cox DJ album Non-stop 2000—CD 1, starting roughly midway through track six, "Funk on the Roll". Cox seamlessly mixed it in the background continuously, through the whole of the next track "Let It Roll", before it plays in its entire original form as track eight.

The song was also sampled in "Custom Made (Give It to You)" by Lil' Kim, which appeared on her album The Notorious K.I.M..

Impact and legacy
American DJ, record producer, remixer and songwriter Armand van Helden picked "French Kiss" as one of his "classic cuts" in 1995, saying, "This song is my first introduction to trance because, to me, it's a serious house track. It was for real house enthusiasts at the time. It's a simple track which builds, it's very electronic. It's full of soul. It's very sexual. It's the first dance track I've known to date to change bpms drastically – I've never heard of an electronic track that had the balls to do that." Also British DJ and producer Pete Tong picked it as one of his "classic cuts" the same year, adding, "One of the most important riffs ever written in house music and frequently imitated but never bettered. Everyone else has put it in their charts so why shouldn't I? I signed it and it makes me proud. You can hear its influence in almost 50% of house music that comes out in Europe."

Mixmag ranked it number 53 in its 100 Greatest Dance Singles of All Time list in 1996, commenting, "Back in 1989, this was the record that every DJ needed. The one that, if you dared mix out it before the slow down - orgasm bit - speed up gimmick, a horde of people would come up to the DJ for a whinge. At the time it was a bit of fun, a peak time stomper for the height of orbital raving. But looking back, nothing else set the repetitive building tone so much for what would become trance. Ten minutes of eyes-closed bliss from Chicago's legendary trackhead."

Q Magazine ranked it number 516 in their list of the 1001 Best Songs Ever in 2003.

Rolling Stone featured it in their 20 Best Chicago House Records list in 2014, saying, "For all the pseudo-romantic flailings of contemporary EDM diva anthems, it's hard to match the raw sexiness of this track, whose vocals came courtesy of Shawn Christopher. But Louis also stretched house's characteristic build-ups to their most dramatic extreme for the era. "French Kiss" is one long, drawn-out crescendo to a climax — get it? — and it hits an almost techno-like, robotic trance."

Slant Magazine ranked it 7th in its 100 Greatest Dance Songs list in 2006, adding, "'French Kiss' is a moaning, sex-as-house track that audaciously and amazingly slows down and then stops altogether. It builds again, chugging back to its initial speed until it fades brighter than ever in post-orgasmic glow." In 2020, the magazine ranked it number 26 in their list of The 100 Best Dance Songs of All Time.

Time Outs 2015 list of The 20 Best House Tracks Ever included it as number four. They wrote, "This number from Chicago's Lil' Louis was one of the first house tracks to enjoy both considerable commercial success and heavy club airplay on its release. Even one listen to its infectious, unrelenting groove and orgasmic tempo shifts is enough to understand why it got everyone so excited.

I 2022, Rolling Stone ranked "French Kiss" number 21 in their list of 200 Greatest Dance Songs of All Time.

Formats and track listings

United Kingdom
 12-inch, cassette and CD single "French Kiss" — 10:02
 "Wargames" — 7:18
• The tracks are actually 9:55 and 7:13 long, respectively, but almost all artwork denote the longer durations.

 7-inch single "French Kiss" — 4:09
 "New York" — 3:40

 French Kisses (The Complete Mix Collection E.P.) – 12-inch, cassette and CD "French Kiss (Original Mix)" — 10:02
 "French Kiss (Innocent Until Proven Guilty Vocal Remix) (Re-Layed)" — 9:45
 "French Kiss (Passion Radio Mix)" — 4:15
 "French Kiss (Back Up Your Conversion Mix)" — 9:45
 "French Kiss (Hitting Virgin Territory Instrumental Mix)" — 3:50

United States
 12-inch single "French Kiss" — 10:02
 "New York" — 3:40
 "Wargames (Remix)" — 7:18
 "Jupiter" — 5:20

 12-inch remix single'
 "French Kiss" (The Original Underground Mix) — 9:54
 "French Kiss" (Talkin' All That Jazz Mix) — 4:14
 "French Kiss" (Short But Sweet Radio Vocal Mix) — 4:08
 "French Kiss" (The Songbird Sings Long Vocal Mix) — 9:59
 "French Kiss" (Cherry Talk Conversational Mix) — 5:29

Charts and certifications

Weekly charts

Year-end charts

Certifications and sales

See also
 List of number-one dance hits (United States)

References

1989 songs
1989 debut singles
1980s instrumentals
Songs about kissing
Lil Louis songs
Epic Records singles
Dutch Top 40 number-one singles
FFRR Records singles
Songs banned by the BBC